Simon E. Sandys-Winsch (1926 – 18 June 1954, died at the Highlander, Isle of Man) was an English professional motorcycle racer, who became the 48th person to be killed on the Snaefell Mountain Course when he crashed on 18 June at the Highlander on the first lap of the Senior TT during the 1954 Isle of Man TT.

From Brundell, Norfolk, in 1947 he started a long-serving term with the RAF. While he was stationed in Germany he became a well-known competitor in Continental competitions and finished 5th in the 1951 Junior Dutch TT at Assen.

Sandys-Winsch also came joint 16th in the 1951 Grand Prix motorcycle racing season with two points, gained in the 350 cc section.

1954 Isle of Man TT

The start of the Senior race was already delayed for at least an hour and a half due to bad weather and increasingly poor visibility. When the race finally started, Sandys-Winsch came off his 350 cc Junior class Velocette machine due to his speed and the wet conditions.

The race was shortened to only four laps because of the weather and the fatal accident. Eight other people were seriously injured in this race.

Sources

1926 births
1954 deaths
British motorcycle racers
English motorcycle racers
500cc World Championship riders
350cc World Championship riders
Isle of Man TT riders
Sport deaths in the Isle of Man
Motorcycle racers who died while racing